Waiting 4U Tour was a co-headlining concert tour by Australian singer Cody Simpson and American singer Greyson Chance. The tour was launched to promote Simpson's debut EP 4 U (2010), and to gain interest and publicity for Greyson Chance. Both singers revealed the announcement of the tour on March 10, 2011 during a live chat with fans on Ustream.

Opening act
Camryn (select dates)
Michael and Marisa (select dates)
Shane Harper (select dates)
Lily Halpern (select dates)

Setlist

Tour dates

Cancellations and rescheduled shows

External links
Cody Simpson Official Website
Greyson Chance Official Website

References

2011 concert tours
Cody Simpson concert tours
Co-headlining concert tours
Greyson Chance